Farshad Salarvand (born May 22, 1988) is an Iranian football player, who currently plays for Mes Rafsanjan in the Persian Gulf Pro League.

References

Iranian footballers
Living people
1988 births
People from Dorud
Association football forwards
Mes Rafsanjan players
Esteghlal Khuzestan players
Pars Jonoubi Jam players
Foolad FC players
Machine Sazi F.C. players